Michel S Nakhla is a Chancellor's Professor at Carleton University and a researcher in Electronic Design Automation. He is the founder of the high-speed CAD research group at Carleton University and is a frequently invited speaker on the topic of high-speed interconnects. He is the first pioneer to introduce the concept of harmonic balance, which is the backbone of current RF and microwave circuit simulators. He was awarded the IEEE Fellowship in 1998 for his contributions to the development of advanced computer-aided design techniques for microwave circuits and high-speed interconnects. He has authored and co-authored over 300 technical papers that contributed significantly to the evolution of the Design Automation field.

References

External links
Michel Nakhla at Carleton University
CAEL (Computer-Aided Engineering Research LAB) at Carleton University

Electronic design automation people
Fellow Members of the IEEE
Academic staff of Carleton University
 University of Waterloo alumni
Year of birth missing (living people)
 Living people